Salad is a type of food dish.

Salad or salads may also refer to:

Arts, entertainment, and media
 Salad (band), a Dutch-British pop band
 Salad Fingers, a Flash cartoon by David Firth
 The Salads, a Canadian rock band

Other uses
 Mahad Mohamed Salad, a Somali politician
 Salad grind, a skateboarding trick
 Word salad, confused or unintelligible speech

See also 
 Ensalada (disambiguation)
 List of salads
 Salad Days (disambiguation)
 Salade, a war helmet
 Salad tossing, a slang term for anilingus